Courts of Alabama include:
;State courts of Alabama
Supreme Court of Alabama
Alabama Court of Civil Appeals
Alabama Court of Criminal Appeals
Alabama Circuit Courts (41 circuits)
Alabama District Courts (67 districts)
Alabama Municipal Courts (273 courts)
Alabama Probate Courts (68 courts)
Alabama Court of the Judiciary

Federal courts located in Alabama

United States District Court for the Northern District of Alabama
United States District Court for the Middle District of Alabama
United States District Court for the Southern District of Alabama

(All United States District Courts in Alabama may be appealed to the United States Court of Appeals for the Eleventh Circuit, headquartered in Atlanta, Georgia)

Former federal courts of Alabama
United States District Court for the District of Alabama (extinct, subdivided in 1824)

References

External links
National Center for State Courts – directory of state court websites.

Courts in the United States